Ballinamuck is a village in north County Longford, Ireland.

It was the scene of the Battle of Ballinamuck, where a French army aiding the United Irishmen rebellion of 1798 was defeated. The French soldiers were eventually repatriated. The Irish prisoners were taken to St Johnstown - today's Ballinalee - where they were executed in what is known locally as Bullys Acre and buried there. Ballinamuck is twinned with the French town of Essert.

Transport
Whartons Travel operates bus route 975 on behalf of the National Transport Authority. It serves the village six times a day (not Sundays) providing services to Longford via Drumlish and to Cavan via Arva. Bus Éireann route 463 (Carrigallen-Longford) serves the village on Wednesdays. The nearest rail services can be accessed at Longford railway station.

References

Towns and villages in County Longford